UNITEC tram stop is located on line  of the tramway de Bordeaux.

Location 
The station is located on avenue du Docteur Albert Schweitzer in Pessac in the university area.

Connections

TBC Network
 Réseau -Bus-

Trans Gironde Network

Close by 
 Université Michel de Montaigne Bordeaux 3
 Université Montesquieu Bordeaux IV
 UNITEC
 Parking relais UNITEC

See also 

 TBC
 Tramway de Bordeaux

Bordeaux tramway stops
Tram stops in Pessac
Railway stations in France opened in 2004